The 2016–17 UAE Pro League (also known as Arabian Gulf League for sponsorship reasons) was the 42nd season of top-level football in the United Arab Emirates. Al-Ahli are the defending champions of this season's UAE pro league after securing their seventh title last season. Al-Jazira won its second title on 29 April 2017 after defeating Hatta 5-0.

Stadia and locations

Personnel and kits

Note: Flags indicate national team as has been defined under FIFA eligibility rules. Players may hold more than one non-FIFA nationality.

Foreign players
The number of foreign players is restricted to four per team, including a slot for a player from AFC countries. A team could use four foreign players on the field during each game including at least one player from the AFC country.

Players name in bold indicates the player is registered during the mid-season transfer window.
Players in italics were out of squad or left club within the season, after pre-season transfer window, or in the mid-season transfer window, and at least had one appearance.

Transfers

Managerial changes

League table

Results

Statistics

Top scorers

Source: agleague.ae

References

UAE Pro League seasons
1
UAE